Alepidea peduncularis is an edible perennial herb native to the montane grasslands of East and South Africa.

Growth
The plant bears a flowering stalk about 70 cm in height, and a basal rosette of leaves with distinctively fringed margins. The leaves are edible, and the roots are used in medicine.

References

External links
PROTAbase on Alepidea peduncularis
 

Edible Apiaceae
Plants used in traditional African medicine